Mashegu is a Local Government Area in Niger State, Nigeria. Its headquarters are in the town of Mashegu in the east of the area. Mashegu is bounded by the Niger River in the west and the Kaduna River in the northeast.

It has an area of 9,182 km and a population of 215,022 at the 2006 census.

The postal code of the area is 923.

References

Local Government Areas in Niger State